Tiffany Lynn Grant (born October 11, 1968) is an American voice actress and script writer who is known for her English-dubbing work for ADV Films on such anime films and television series as Neon Genesis Evangelion, in which she voiced the character Asuka Langley Soryu.

Biography 
Grant was born in Houston, Texas. She was the first actor hired by ADV Films in February 1994. Grant's first work in the field was Raina from Guy: Double Target. In 1996, she was cast as Asuka Langley Soryu, one of the main female characters in Neon Genesis Evangelion. She would later go on to write ADR scripts for several anime shows, having written over 200 TV episodes to date. Grant is also known for portraying Nojiko in One Piece, Altena in Noir, and Ryoko Subaru in Martian Successor Nadesico. Grant is an independent contractor, and in addition to her work at ADV Films, she has also worked for Funimation, Seraphim Digital/Sentai Filmworks, and Illumitoon Entertainment.

Grant enjoyed her role as Asuka Soryu so much that she briefly reprised the character in the radio plays and fan-produced anime derived from the fan fiction series Neon Genesis Evangelion: R, as well as cosplaying as Asuka in her red EVA-02 plugsuit and her school uniform at anime conventions. She reprised the role of Asuka in Funimation's Evangelion: 2.0 You Can (Not) Advance. In 2014, she reprised as Asuka again for Evangelion: 3.0 You Can (Not) Redo, and she once again played Asuka in Evangelion: 3.0+1.0 Thrice Upon a Time.

Personal life 
Grant married A.D. Vision co-founder Matt Greenfield on March 8, 2003. They divorced on January 4, 2018.

Dubbing roles

Anime
1994
 Guy: Double Target – Raina (debut role)
1995
 Burn Up! – Maki
 Samurai Shodown: The Motion Picture – Charlotte, Goro's Mom 
1996
 Blue Seed – Kome Sawaguchi
 Burn-Up W – Maki
 Devil Hunter Yohko – Chikako Ogawa
 Ellcia – Eira
 F³ – Mayaka
 Golden Boy – President
 Gunsmith Cats – Becky Farrah
 Neon Genesis Evangelion – Asuka Langley Soryu (ADV dub)
 Power Dolls – Millicient Evans
 Super Atragon – Avatar, Go (Young)
1997
 Fire Emblem – Sister Lena
 Kimera – Jay's Wife
 Plastic Little – Elysse
 Sol Bianca – June Ashel
1998
 Dark Warrior – Rosa
 Dragon Knight – Queen Neina
 Galaxy Fraulein Yuna – Mai
 Kimagure Orange Road: Summer's Beginning – Minami Asakura
 New Cutey Honey – Daiko Hayami
 Princess Minerva – Orlin
 Slayers: The Motion Picture – Loofa
 Those Who Hunt Elves – Mihke, Pichi
1999
 Dirty Pair OVA – Sam
 Sorcerer Hunters – Chocolate Misu
 Martian Successor Nadesico – Ryoko Subaru
2000
 Dragon Half – Dug Finn
2001
 Princess Nine – Yoko Tokashiki, Rumi
2002
 Chance Pop Session – Jun
 Excel Saga – Misaki Matsuya, Kumi-Kumi, Sendora
 Neon Genesis Evangelion: Death and Rebirth – Asuka Langley Soryuu
 The End of Evangelion – Asuka Langley Soryuu
 Steel Angel Kurumi – Tsunami
2003
 All Purpose Cultural Cat Girl Nuku Nuku – Kyouko
 Angelic Layer – Sai Jounouchi
 Aura Battler Dunbine – Queen Pat Ford
 Legend of the Mystical Ninja – Tsukasa
 Magical Shopping Arcade Abenobashi – Gin Yamamoto, Amiryun
 Martian Successor Nadesico: The Motion Picture – Prince of Darkness – Ryoko Subaru
 Najica Blitz Tactics – Ai Irie, Alpha, Tomo, BBB
 Neo Ranga – Tomoka Chikamatsu
 Noir – Altena
 Prétear – A-ko
 RahXephon – Kim Hotaru
 Saint Seiya – Akira, Mimo (ADV Dub)
2004
 Aquarian Age: Sign for Evolution – Kiriko Heguri
 Azumanga Daioh – Kaorin
 Case Closed (FUNimation dub) – Tina Fontana (Ep. 22), Tracy Monroe (Ep. 55)
 Chrono Crusade – Satella Harvenheit
 Cyber Team in Akihabara – Suzume Sakurajosui, Francesca
 D.N. Angel – Yuji Nishimura
 Fullmetal Alchemist – Marta
 Grrl Power – Riku
 Kaleido Star – Jonathan the Seal, Charlotte
 Mezzo DSA – Manon
 Megazone 23 OVA – Cindy (Part 2), Dominique (Part 3) (ADV dub)
 Orphen Revenge – Esperanza
 Panyo Panyo Di Gi Charat – Gema
 Puni Puni Poemy – Kumi Kumi, Mage Queen
 Sister Princess – Haruka
 Slayers Excellent – Sirene
 A Tree of Palme – Pu

2005
 Divergence Eve – Lt. Yung
 Elfen Lied – Kisaragi
 Full Metal Panic? Fumoffu – Bonta-Kun, Yoshiki Akutsu
 Godannar – Shizuru Fujimura
 Maburaho – Kuriko Kazetsubaki
 Princess Tutu – Anteaterina
 Wandaba Style – Susumu Tsukumo
2006
 Comic Party Revolution – Yu Inagawa
 Nanaka 6/17 – Pikota
 Papuwa – Eguchi
 Shin-chan (Funimation dub) – Summer
 Speed Grapher – Joe's Girlfriend (Ep. 19)
 The Super Dimension Fortress Macross – Hikaru Ichijo (Young), Moruk Laplamiz
 UFO Ultramaiden Valkyrie – Nina
2007
 Air – Potato
 Beet the Vandel Buster – Beet (Young)
 Best Student Council – Biiko Mikawa, Hikaruko Kenma
 Gurren Lagann – Yoko Littner (aborted ADV dub)
 Hell Girl – Masami Sekimoto
 Jing, King of Bandits: Seventh Heaven – Mint
 Kurau: Phantom Memory – Ayaka Stieger
 Mushishi – Suzu (Ep. 15)
 One Piece – Nojiko, Harry, Shalria (Funimation dub)
 Tsubasa: Reservoir Chronicle – Ashuraou
 The Wallflower – Sunako's Aunt
 Xenosaga: The Animation – Juli Mizrahi
2008
 Magikano – Rika Anju
 Moonlight Mile – Akemi Saruwatari, Connie  Wong, Narrator (Ep. 5-8)
 Ouran High School Host Club – Kuretake (Ep. 11)
2010
 Blue Drop – Akane Kawashima, Mitsuyo Asakura, Blue A.I.
 Fullmetal Alchemist: Brotherhood – Martel
 Linebarrels of Iron – Yui Ogawa
 Tears to Tiara – Morgan
2011
 Clannad After Story – Harada, Additional Voices
 Rebuild of Evangelion – Asuka Langley Shikinami
 Five Numbers! – R21 (Woman/Sting), Coupier (The Cat)
 Night Raid 1931 – Qing-Li Cui (Ep. 0), Additional Voices
2012
 Ef: A Fairy Tale of the Two – Sumire Asou
 The Book of Bantorra – Rithly Charon
 Infinite Stratos – Laura Bodewig, Yuko Tanitomo
 Planzet – Yura Yoshizawa
2013
 AKB0048 – Kirara, Yuka's Mother
 Another – Bird
 Bodacious Space Pirates – Izumi Yunomoto
 Fairy Tail the Movie: Phoenix Priestess – Momon
 Girls und Panzer – Midoriko Sono/Sadoko
 Intrigue in the Bakumatsu – Irohanihoheto – Oryo (Ep. 9-10)
 Majikoi! – Oh! Samurai Girls – Christiane Friedrich
 Little Busters! – Kudryavka Noumi, Chernushka
 Nakaimo – My Sister is Among Them! – Maiko Kotori
 One Piece Film: Strong World – Nojiko
 Say "I Love You". – Mei's Mother
 Shining Hearts: Shiawase no Pan – Sorbet
 Tokyo Magnitude 8.0 – Yuki Onosawa
 Tsuritama – Coco
2014
 Hakkenden: Eight Dogs of the East – Fox Guardians
 MM! – Shizuka Sado
 Majestic Prince – Marie, Peko Yamada
 Maria Holic – Yonakuri-san, Mii Habutae
 Tamako Market – Fumiko Mitsumura
 The Ambition of Oda Nobuna – Ikeda Tsuneoki, Magara Naozumi, Mitsuhide's Mother
2015
 Akame ga Kill! – Girl in Trouble (Ep. 2), Koro, Rogue (Bols' Daughter, Ep. 13)
 Magical Warfare – Mahoko
 The World God Only Knows – Lune
 Vampire Hunter D – Medusa (Sentai dub)
2016
 Cross Ange – Emma Bronson
 Den-noh Coil - Densuke, Daichi Sawaguchi
 Fate/kaleid Prism Illya 2wei! – Sella
 Re: Hamatora – Nice (Young)
 Hanayamata – Jennifer N. Fountainstand
 Wizard Barristers – Megumi Sudo, Keiji
2017
 Ushio and Tora - Saya Takatori, Helena Markov
 Amagi Brilliant Park - Moffle
 Chivalry of a Failed Knight - Renren Tomaru, Young Ikki Kurogane
 Tamako Love Story - Fumiko Mitsumura, Baton girls, Sweets girl
2018
 Flip Flappers - Cocona's grandmother

Video games
 Unlimited Saga - Armic
 Deus Ex: Invisible War – Klara Sparks
 Brawl Stars – Bea
 Warframe – Roky

ADR staff credits

English translator
 Ah! My Goddess: Flights of Fancy
 Angelic Layer
 Coicent
 Comic Party Revolution
 Den-noh Coil
 Fire Emblem
 Godannar
 Infinite Stratos
 Maburaho
 Parasyte -the maxim-
 Sister Princess
 Tears to Tiara
 The Wallflower

References

External links
 
 
 The Webdomain of Miss Tiffany Grant
 
 CrystalAcids Anime Voice Actor Database

1968 births
Living people
Actresses from Georgia (U.S. state)
Actresses from Houston
American film actresses
American television actresses
American television writers
American video game actresses
American voice actresses
American women screenwriters
College of Charleston alumni
People from Hampton, Georgia
Screenwriters from Georgia (U.S. state)
Screenwriters from Texas
American women television writers
Writers from Georgia (U.S. state)
Writers from Houston
20th-century American actresses
20th-century American women writers
21st-century American actresses
21st-century American women writers